Claw hand can refer to:
 Ectrodactyly
 A symptom of Ulnar nerve entrapment. See Ulnar claw